The NHS Funding Act 2020 (c. 5) is an act of the Parliament of the United Kingdom that sets out the funding for NHS England from 2021 to 2024 that the Secretary of State for Health and Social Care must allot to the respective trusts. This form part of the Government's NHS long-term plan and puts the Chancellor of the Exchequer under a "legal duty" to ensure this money, at a minimum, is spent on the NHS.

Provisions

Section 1 - Funding Settlement for the Health Service in England 
The Secretary of State for Health and Social Care must "allot an amount that is at least the amount specified" in the table below:

Section 2 
This act extends to England and Wales. It comes into force on the day on which it is passed and expires at the end of 31 March 2024.

References 

Acts of the Parliament of the United Kingdom concerning healthcare
2020 in British law
United Kingdom Acts of Parliament 2020
NHS legislation